The Potomac Highlands Airport Authority is an Interstate Agency that operates the Greater Cumberland Regional Airport, two miles south of Cumberland, Maryland in the state of West Virginia.
The authority was ratified in 1976 by the legislatures of Maryland and West Virginia (Maryland Chapter 253, Acts of 1976; West Virginia Chapter 135, Acts of 1976), and by the US Congress in 1988 (P.L 105-348).

References
Potomac Highlands Airport Authority 

United States interstate agencies
Government of West Virginia
Government of Maryland
Aviation in Maryland